The  GER Class S56 was a class of  steams designed by James Holden for the Great Eastern Railway.  Together with some rebuilt examples of GER Class R24, they passed to the London and North Eastern Railway at the grouping in 1923, and received the LNER classification J69.

History
The Class S56 were a development of the Class R24, being almost identical, apart from higher boiler pressure and larger water tanks. Twenty were built in 1904 at Stratford Works.

All twenty passed to the LNER in 1923. Thirteen class J69 locomotives were lent to the War Department in October 1939, of which five had been built as Class S56. They were sold to the War Department in October 1940, where they were used on the Melbourne and Longmoor Military Railways. The remaining locomotives were renumbered 8617–8636 in order of construction; however gaps were left where the locomotives sold to the War Department would have been. At nationalisation in 1948, the remainder passed to British Railways, who added 60000 to their number. Post-war withdrawals started in 1958, and by 1962 all had been retired.

Preservation

GER no. 87 (LNER 7087, 8633, BR 68633) has been preserved, initially at the Clapham Transport Museum, and now at the National Railway Museum. It is currently on display at Bressingham Steam Museum.

References

External links 

  — Great Eastern Railway Society
 The Holden J67 & J69 (GER Class R24, R24 Rebuilt, & S56) 0-6-0T Locomotives — LNER Encyclopedia

S56
0-6-0T locomotives
Railway locomotives introduced in 1904
War Department locomotives
Standard gauge steam locomotives of Great Britain